Zotepine is an atypical antipsychotic drug indicated for acute and chronic schizophrenia. It has been used in Germany since 1990 (although it has been discontinued in Germany) and Japan since 1982.

Zotepine is not approved for use in the United States, United Kingdom, Australia, Canada or New Zealand.

Medical uses
Zotepine's primary use is as a treatment for schizophrenia although clinical trials have been conducted (with positive results) into its efficacy as an antimanic agent in patients with acute bipolar mania. In a 2013 study in a comparison of 15 antipsychotic drugs in effectivity in treating schizophrenic symptoms, zotepine demonstrated medium-strong effectivity. Less effective than clozapine, slightly less effective than olanzapine and risperidone, approximately as effective as paliperidone, and slightly more effective than haloperidol, quetiapine, and aripiprazole.

Side effects
 Common

 Tachycardia
 Hypotension
 Orthostatic hypotension
 Palpitations
 Hyperprolactinaemia
 Weight gain (produces a similar degree of weight gain to that seen with clozapine and olanzapine treatment)
 Somnolence (2nd highest effect size for causing sedation out of fifteen antipsychotics compared in a recent meta-analysis)
 Extrapyramidal side effects [EPSE] (2nd largest odds ratio for causing EPSE out of fifteen antipsychotics compared in a recent meta-analysis, second only to haloperidol)
 Constipation
 Xerostomia (dry mouth)
 Blurred vision
 Hypersalivation (drooling)
 Mydriasis
 Anxiety
 Agitation
 Rhinitis
 Sexual dysfunction
 Dyspnoea
 Diarrhoea
 Influenza-like symptoms
 Cough
 Vertigo
 Confusion
 Dyspepsia
 Flushing dry skin
 Arthralgia
 Myalgia
 Acne
 Conjunctivitis
 Thrombocythaemia

Unknown frequency

 QT interval prolongation
 Hyperthermia
 Hypothermia
 Increased serum creatinine
 Hyperglycaemia
 Hypoglycaemia
 Hyperlipidaemia
 Thirst
 Urinary incontinence

Rare

 Angle-closure glaucoma
 Agranulocytosis
 Neutropaenia
 Eosinophilia
 Leukocytopenia
 Hypoesthesia
 Anaemia
 Myoclonus
 Myasthenia
 Alopecia
 Thrombocytopaenia
 Bradycardia
 Epistaxis
 Abdominal enlargement
 Deep vein thrombosis
 Paralytic ileus
 Leukopenia
 Tardive dyskinesia
 Neuroleptic malignant syndrome
 Laryngeal edema
 Urinary retention
 Depression
 Ataxia
 Amnesia
 Seizure (dose-dependent risk)
 Metabolic syndrome
 Diabetes mellitus type II
 Cholestasis
 Increased liver enzymes
 Photosensitivity
 Exanthema
 Pruritus
 Hypouricemia
 Oedema

Pharmacology

Pharmacodynamics
The antipsychotic effect of zotepine is thought to be mediated through antagonist activity at dopamine and serotonin receptors. Zotepine has a high affinity for the D1 and D2 receptors. It also affects the 5-HT2A, 5-HT2C, 5-HT6, and 5-HT7 receptors. In addition, its active metabolite, norzotepine, serves as a potent norepinephrine reuptake inhibitor.

Society and culture

Brand names
Brand names include Losizopilon (JP), Lodopin (ID, JP), Setous (JP), Zoleptil (CZ, PT, TR, UK†); where † indicates a formulation that has been discontinued.

See also
 Carbinoxamine, diphenhydramine, doxylamine, and orphenadrine—the termination chain is the same
 Dosulepin
 Noxiptyline
 Toll-like receptor 4—investigating probable antagonistic (antiinflammatory) property of several TCA-based molecules

References

Further reading

 
 

Alpha-2 blockers
Atypical antipsychotics
Chloroarenes
Dibenzothiepines
Dimethylamino compounds
Norepinephrine reuptake inhibitors